Claudine Brunand (1630 in Lyon – 1674) was a French poet and engraver, who had learned the art of engraving from her father, Aymé Brunand. Brunand was likely related to the woodcutter Michel Brunand. She worked for several printers and publishers in her native Lyon as well as in Germany. She remained unmarried but was able to earn a living with a profession that was dominated by men. At first, Brunand's oeuvre consisted only of commissions for portraits and  frontispieces. In 1670, she illustrated the life of Teresa of Avila with 56 engravings in a work entitled La Vie de la Seraphique Mere Sainte Terese de Jesus, Fondatrice des Carmes Déchaussez & des Carmelites Déchaussées. En Figures, & en Vers François & Latins. Avec un Abbregé de l’Histoire, une Reflexion Morale, & une Resolution Chrestienne sur châque Figure. Brunand also made heraldic paintings.

Bibliography 
 Véronique Meyer, « Claudine Brunand, femme et graveuse », Nouvelles de l’estampe [online], 263 (2020), http://journals.openedition.org/estampe/1437.

1630 births
1670 deaths
17th-century French women writers
French engravers
Women engravers
Writers from Lyon
Artists from Lyon
French women poets
17th-century French women artists
17th-century French poets